A Desolation Called Peace is a 2021 space opera science fiction novel by Arkady Martine. It is the sequel to A Memory Called Empire, and the second novel in Martine's Teixcalaan series. Like its predecessor, the book won the Hugo Award for Best Novel, in 2022.

Synopsis 
A few months after A Memory Called Empire, alien forces massacre an industrial colony of the Teixcalaanli Empire. The Teixcalaanli admiral Nine Hibiscus, tasked with confronting the threat, requests an Information Ministry specialist to attempt to communicate with the inscrutable enemy. That specialist is Three Seagrass, now a senior Imperial official, who smuggles herself to the frontlines by way of Lsel Station. There, she convinces her former associate and still nominal ambassador to the Empire, Mahit Dzmare, to accompany her. Mahit seizes on the chance to escape the increasing danger from factional conflicts on Lsel, and she is tasked by one of Lsel's leaders to sabotage first-contact efforts in order to prolong the Empire's war with the aliens.

In Nine Hibiscus's fleet, the two women develop methods to communicate with the aliens and restart their romantic relationship. With the aid of Nine Hibiscus's adjutant, Twenty Cicada, they establish a line of communication to the enemy, who turn out to be a hive mind that does not understand the personhood of individuals. Their fragile truce is almost foiled when a rebellious subordinate of Nine Hibiscus launches an attack with weapons of mass destruction against one of the enemy's home planets. But an intervention by Eight Antidote, the emperor's young heir, back in the capital allows Nine Hibiscus to stop the attack. As the prospect of further war recedes, Mahit considers a future in the Empire after having burned her bridges to Lsel.

Major themes
Continuing with themes from the first book in the series, the book tackles subjects conquest and colonialism, what constitutes language, and personal connection to culture and institutions. The book also introduces new themes such as collective consciousness.

The title alludes to a famous phrase by Tacitus who quotes a Caledonian chieftain describing the policies of the Roman Empire:  – "they make a wasteland and call it peace".

Reception 
A Desolation Called Peace won the 2022 Hugo Award for Best Novel.

In his starred BookPage review, Noah Fram compares how Martine’s debut effort showcased her talents in creating a gripping narrative, blending humor and consummate world building, to the more cerebral thematic exploration in A Desolation Called Peace, which he writes features "some of the cleverest and most elegant foreshadowing in modern science fiction." He predicts that as well-deserving of the Hugo Award A Memory Called Empire was, Desolation "might just eclipse it."

According to Martin Cahill in Tor.com the novel is both an action-packed space opera and a "thoughtful, complicated examination of identity, language, personhood, and truth." Lisa Tuttle in The Guardian wrote that it was "first-class space opera, with added spycraft, diplomatic intrigue and scary aliens, along with interesting explorations of perception, ways of communicating, and what makes a person."

The book review aggregator site Book Marks rated Desolation as "Rave", based on six trade publication reviews.

References

External links 
 A Desolation Called Peace on tor.com

2021 American novels
2020s LGBT novels
2021 science fiction novels
Hugo Award for Best Novel-winning works
LGBT speculative fiction novels
Space opera novels
Tor Books books